Dalton Banks is an American politician and a Republican member of the Wyoming House of Representatives representing the 26th district since January 10, 2023.

Political career
When incumbent Republican representative Jamie Flitner announced her retirement, Banks declared his candidacy and won the Republican primary on August 16, 2022, defeating fellow candidates Gary Welch, Timothy Mills, and Tim Beck with 56% of the vote. He then won the general election on November 8, 2022, unopposed.

References

External links
Profile from Ballotpedia

Living people
Republican Party members of the Wyoming House of Representatives
People from Powell, Wyoming
21st-century American politicians
21st-century American women politicians
People from Big Horn County, Wyoming
Year of birth missing (living people)